Alexandru Giura (born 11 February 1957) is a Romanian sprint canoer who competed in the late 1970s and the early 1980s. He won a silver medal in the K-4 1000 m event at the 1978 ICF Canoe Sprint World Championships in Belgrade.

At the 1980 Summer Olympics in Moscow, Giura finished fourth in the K-2 1000 m and sixth in the K-2 500 m events.

References

Sport-reference.com profile

1957 births
Canoeists at the 1980 Summer Olympics
Living people
Olympic canoeists of Romania
Romanian male canoeists
ICF Canoe Sprint World Championships medalists in kayak